The 1999 Scheldeprijs was the 86th edition of the Scheldeprijs cycle race and was held on 21 April 1999. The race was won by Jeroen Blijlevens of the TVM team.

General classification

References

1999
1999 in road cycling
1999 in Belgian sport
April 1999 sports events in Europe